Rudy Matthijs (born 3 March 1959, in Eeklo) is a Belgian retired professional road bicycle racer. He won 4 stages in the Tour de France, 3 of which came during the 1985 Tour de France on stages 1 and 2, and then on the final stage of the tour with one of the biggest sprinter's stages in all of cycling on the Champs Elysees.

Major results

1981
 1st Omloop Schelde-Durme
 1st Stage 5 Vuelta a Aragón
 2nd Omloop van de Vlaamse Scheldeboorden
 3rd Polder–Kempen
1982
 1st Grand Prix de Fourmies
 1st Grote Prijs Jef Scherens
 2nd Omloop van het Leiedal
 3rd Nokere Koerse
1983
 1st Ronde van Limburg
 1st Leeuwse Pijl
 1st Stage 3 Tour de France
 1st Stage 2 Tour de Luxembourg
 2nd Brabantse Pijl
 7th Overall Three Days of De Panne
 7th Dwars door België
 9th Omloop Het Volk
1984
 1st Kampioenschap van Vlaanderen
 1st Stages 2 & 4 Tour de Luxembourg
 1st Stage 5a (ITT) Four Days of Dunkirk
 2nd Dwars door België
 5th Tour of Flanders
 9th GP Stad Zottegem
 10th Paris–Roubaix
1985
 Tour de France
1st Stages 1, 2 & 22
 1st Stage 7 Tour de Suisse
 1st Stage 6 Vuelta a Aragón
 2nd GP Ouest–France
 2nd Leeuwse Pijl
 3rd Overall Four Days of Dunkirk
1st Stages 1 & 3
 3rd Overall Tour of Belgium
 8th Kuurne–Brussels–Kuurne

External links 

Official Tour de France results for Rudy Matthijs

Belgian male cyclists
1959 births
Living people
Belgian Tour de France stage winners
Tour de France Champs Elysées stage winners
Cyclists from East Flanders
Tour de Suisse stage winners
People from Eeklo
20th-century Belgian people